King George County Schools is a school division that serves students in King George County, Virginia. The district administers 3 elementary schools, 1 middle school, and 1 high school.

It serves serves all parts of the county for grades PK-12, except for those within Naval Surface Warfare Center Dahlgren Division, which are served by the Department of Defense Education Activity (DoDEA), for grades K-8.

Administration

Superintendent 
The superintendent of King George County Schools is Robert Benson. Before being appointed in 2012, he was an assistant superintendent for Cobb County School District.

School Board 
There are five members of the King George County School Board:

 T.C. Collins
 Carrie Gonzalez, Chairman
 Gayle Hock, Vice Chairman
 Gina M. Panciera
 Kristin Tolliver

Schools 
There are 5 schools in King George County.

Elementary schools 
King George Elementary School

 King George, Virginia
 Principal: Ronald Monroe 
 Mascot: Eagles

Potomac Elementary School

 King George, Virginia
 Principal: Dr. Melinda Brown 
 Mascot: Hawks

Sealston Elementary School

 King George, Virginia
 Principal: Sandra Elia 
 Mascot: Tigers

Middle school 
King George Middle School
King George, Virginia
 Principal: Dr. Casey Nice
 Mascot: Foxes

High school 
King George High School
King George, Virginia
 Principal: Marcus Watson
 Mascot: Foxes

References 

Schools in Virginia
Education in King George County, Virginia